Lewis McCann (born 7 June 2001) is a professional footballer who plays as forward for Dunfermline Athletic. Born in Scotland, he has represented Northern Ireland at youth international level.

Early and personal life
McCann and his brothers, Ali (also a footballer) and Ross (Scotland rugby 7s player), were born in Scotland to a Northern Irish father and an English mother.
He attended Royal High School in Edinburgh.

Career

Club
Born in Edinburgh, McCann played youth football with Lothian Thistle Hutchison Vale, Heart of Midlothian and Fife Elite Football Academy, before signing his first professional contract with Dunfermline Athletic in May 2018. His first appearance for the side came in July 2018 as a second-half substitute in a Scottish League Cup game against Peterhead.

International
McCann said of his international eligibility, “Northern Ireland were the first country that came to me. I don’t really have a preference what country I play for. My dad’s from Northern Ireland, my mum’s from London and I was born here in Scotland."

McCann has represented Northern Ireland at under-19 level.

Career statistics

References

External links

2001 births
Living people
Footballers from Edinburgh
Association footballers from Northern Ireland
Northern Ireland youth international footballers
Scottish footballers
People from Northern Ireland of English descent
Scottish people of Northern Ireland descent
Scottish people of English descent
Association football forwards
Scottish Professional Football League players
Dunfermline Athletic F.C. players